Odabaşı is a Turkish surname. Notable people with the surname include:

Ferhat Odabaşı (born 1983), Turkish footballer
İsmail Haktan Odabaşı (born 1991), Turkish footballer
Tevfik Odabaşı (born 1981), Turkish wrestler

Turkish-language surnames